Rubén Adrián Silva (born 20 August 1964 in Montevideo, Uruguay) is a former Uruguayan footballer who last played for clubs of Uruguay, Chile and México.

Teams
  Huracán Buceo 1983–1988
  Nacional 1989
  Cobras de Ciudad Juárez 1989–1990
  Bella Vista 1990
  Defensor Sporting 1991
  Nacional 1992
  Deportes Temuco 1993–1996
  Huracán Buceo 1997
  Danubio 1997
  Huracán Buceo 1998
  Racing Club de Montevideo 1999
  Central Español 2000–2002
  Huracán Buceo 2003–2004

References

External links
 

1964 births
Living people
Uruguayan footballers
Uruguayan expatriate footballers
Danubio F.C. players
Huracán Buceo players
Central Español players
C.A. Bella Vista players
Defensor Sporting players
Racing Club de Montevideo players
Club Nacional de Football players
Deportes Temuco footballers
Chilean Primera División players
Expatriate footballers in Chile
Expatriate footballers in Mexico
Association footballers not categorized by position
Rampla Juniors managers